Lenny Pirringuel (born 2 March 2004) is a French professional footballer who plays as a midfielder for  club Bordeaux.

Club career 
On 21 December 2020, Pirringuel signed his first professional contract with Bordeaux, a deal lasting until 2023. He became the youngest professional player in the history of the club, tied with Henri Saivet. On 27 August 2022, Pirringuel made his professional debut for the club in a 1–0 Ligue 2 loss to Guingamp. He scored his first goal for Bordeaux in a 1–1 league draw against Pau on 12 November 2022.

International career 
Pirringuel is eligible to represent both France and Benin. As a French youth international, he has made appearances for the under-16, under-18, and under-19 sides. In 2022, he was part of the squad that won the Mediterranean Games.

Personal life 
Born in France, Pirringuel is of Beninese descent.

Honours 
France U18

 Mediterranean Games: 2022

References

External links 
 
 

2004 births
Living people
Sportspeople from Gironde
People from Talence
French footballers
Association football midfielders
France youth international footballers
French sportspeople of Beninese descent
Black French sportspeople
FC Girondins de Bordeaux players
Championnat National 3 players
Ligue 2 players